Bernadette Ivalooarjuk Saumik (born 1938) is an Inuit artist known for her stone sculptures. Saumik was born in Arctic Bay, Northwest Territories.

Her work is included in the collections of the National Gallery of Canada, the Winnipeg Art Gallery and the Bowers Museum.

References

 1938 births
20th-century Canadian sculptors
20th-century Canadian women artists
21st-century Canadian sculptors
21st-century Canadian women artists
Inuit artists
Living people
Canadian women sculptors
People from Arctic Bay
Artists from Nunavut
Inuit from Nunavut